Nomreh-ye Yazdah (also Romanized as Nomreh-ye Yāzdah and Nomreh Yāzdah; also known as Nomreh Vāzdah) is a village in Tombi Golgir Rural District, Golgir District, Masjed Soleyman County, Khuzestan Province, Iran. At the 2006 census, its population was 341, in 69 families.

References 

Populated places in Masjed Soleyman County